Zard Aluiyeh (also Romanized as Zard Ālū’īyeh; also known as Zardālū and Zardālūyeh) is a village in Javaran Rural District, Hanza District, Rabor County, Kerman Province, Iran. At the 2006 census, its population was 31, in 8 families.

References 

Populated places in Rabor County